Thomson Jay Hudson (February 22, 1834 in Windham, Ohio – May 26, 1903 in Detroit, Michigan), was a chief examiner of the US Patent Office and a psychical researcher, known for his three laws of psychic phenomena, which were first published in 1893.

Refusing his father's wish to become a minister of religion, Hudson funded his own study of law at college. He began a law practice in Port Huron, Michigan but, in 1860, he began a journalistic career instead. In 1866, he unsuccessfully ran for the US Senate. From 1877 till 1880 he was Washington correspondent for the Scripps Syndicate. In 1880 he accepted a position in the US Patent Office and was promoted to principal examiner of a Scientific Division, a post he held until the publication of The Law of Psychic Phenomena in 1893.

He wrote and lectured on this subject until his death from heart failure in 1903.

Hudson's theory
Thomson Jay Hudson began observing hypnotism shows and noticed similarities between hypnosis subjects and the trances of Spiritualist mediums. His idea was that any contact with "spirits" was contact with the medium's or the subject's own subconscious. Anything else could be explained by telepathy, which he defined as contact between two or more subconsciouses. Hudson postulated that his theory could explain all forms of spiritualism and had a period of popularity until the carnage of the First World War caused a fresh interest in spiritualism again as psychic mediums emerged to meet the demands of grieving relatives.

"Two minds" 
In The Law of Psychic Phenomena (1893, p.26), Hudson spoke of an "objective mind" and a "subjective mind"; and, as he further explained, his theoretical position was that:
our "mental organization" was such that it seemed as if we had "two minds, each endowed with separate and distinct attributes and powers; [with] each capable, under certain conditions, of independent action" (p.25); and, for explanatory purposes, it was entirely irrelevant, argued Hudson, whether we actually had "two distinct minds", whether we only seemed to be "endowed with a dual mental organization", or whether we actually had "one mind [possessed of] certain attributes and powers under some conditions, and certain other attributes and powers under other conditions" (pp.25-26).

Hudson's three laws
 Man has two minds: the objective mind (conscious) and the subjective mind (subconscious).
 The subjective mind is constantly amenable to control by suggestion.
 The subjective mind is incapable of inductive reasoning.

Works
 The Law of Psychic Phenomena: Systematic Study of Hypnotism, Spiritism, Mental Therapeutics, Etc., A.C. McClurg and Company, (Chicago), 1893.
 A Scientific Demonstration of the Future Life, A.C. McClurg and Company, (Chicago), 1895.
 The Divine Pedigree of Man; or, The Testimony of Evolution and Psychology to the Fatherhood of God, A.C. McClurg and Company, (Chicago), 1899.
 The Law of Mental Medicine: The Correlation of the Facts of Psychology and Histology in their Relation to Mental Therapeutics, A.C. McClurg & Co. (Chicago), 1903.
 Evolution of the Soul and Other Essays: With Portrait and Biographical Sketch (Sixth Edition), A.C. McClurg & Co. (Chicago), 1920: first edition published in 1904.
Also
 Bell, Clark & Hudson, Thomson Jay, Spiritism, Hypnotism and Telepathy: As Involved in the Case of Mrs. Leonora E. Piper and the Society for Psychical Research, by Clark Bell, Esq/, LL.D.. President of the Medico-Legal Society, and the Discussion Thereon, by Thomson Jay Hudson, LL.D., and more than 20 observers, with Portraits of the Authors (Second Edition), Medico-Legal Journal (New York), 1904: first edition published in 1902.

Footnotes

References
 "Hudson, Thomson Jay (1834—1903)", p.752 in, J. Gordon Melton, Encyclopedia of Occultism and Parapsychology (Fifth Edition), Volume One: A-L, Farmington Hills, MI: Thomson Gale, 2001.

1834 births
1903 deaths
Parapsychologists
People from Windham, Ohio